The Year of the French was a television serial, directed by Michael Garvey and based on the novel by Thomas Flanagan, which was first broadcast in 1982. It was a co-production by the Irish broadcaster RTÉ, the British television company Channel Four and the French broadcaster FR3, now France 3. The first episode was shown on RTÉ television on 18 November 1982. In France the programme was known as L'année des Français and was first broadcast on 23 May 1983.

The title refers to the year 1798 when French troops sailed to Ireland to support Irish rebels against the British forces under Lord Cornwallis.

To accompany the series Paddy Moloney composed and arranged music which was performed by The Chieftains with the RTÉ Concert Orchestra, conducted by Proinnsias O'Duinn, and with Ruairi Somers on bagpipes. The album of this music was released in 1983.

Historian Guy Beiner has shown that the filming of the series on location in Killala, County Mayo made an impact on local folklore and regenerated oral traditions of Bliain na bhFrancach (the Irish language term for The Year of the French, which was commonly used to refer to memories of the French invasion and local rebellion in 1798).

Cast

 Jean-Claude Drouot: Général Humbert
 Keith Buckley: Samuel Cooper
 François Perrot: Barras
 Gilles Ségal: La Réveillière
 Niall O'Brien: Owen MacCarthy
 Donald Bisset: Lord Cornwallis
 Jeremy Clyde: Malcolm Elliott
 Nuala Holloway: Nora 
 Anne-Louise Lambert: Ellen Treacy
 Jonathan Ryan: Randal McDonnell
 Robert Stephens: George Moore
 Jacques Zabor: Sarrazin
 Bryan Murray: Ferdy O'Donnell
 Gareth Forwood: Wyndham
 Mick Lally
 Marius Goring: Lord Glenthorne
 Frank Kelly: Corny O'Dowd

References

External links
 

1798 French campaign in Ireland
1982 British television series debuts
1982 British television series endings
Channel 4 original programming
English-language Irish films
English-language French films
French-language films
Irish-language films
RTÉ original programming
Television series set in the 18th century
Television series set in Ireland